Mathías Calfani (born January 21, 1992) is an Uruguayan professional basketball player. Standing at 2.04 m (6' 8)" tall, he plays at the power forward and center positions.

Professional career
In his pro club career, Calfani has played in both the South American 2nd-tier level FIBA South American League, and the South American 1st-tier level FIBA Americas League.

In 2019, he signed with Kawasaki Brave Thunders. Calfani averaged 10 points, 5 rebounds, 2 assist and 2 steals per game, shooting 57% from the field. He re-signed with the team on June 21, 2020.

National team career
Calfani is a member of the senior Uruguayan national basketball team. He won the bronze medal at the 2010 FIBA South American Championship, 2012 FIBA South American Championship, and 2016 FIBA South American Championships.

Awards and accomplishments
2010 FIBA South American Championship: 
2012 FIBA South American Championship: 
2016 FIBA South American Championship:

References

External links
FIBA Profile 
Latinbasket.com Profile
Basquetplus.com Profile 

1992 births
Living people
Centers (basketball)
Club Atlético Tabaré basketball players
Club Biguá de Villa Biarritz basketball players
Club Malvín basketball players
Kawasaki Brave Thunders players
People from Artigas, Uruguay
Power forwards (basketball)
San Lorenzo de Almagro (basketball) players
Uruguayan expatriate basketball people in Argentina
Uruguayan men's basketball players